The Innsbruck Nature Film Festival (INFF) is an annually held film competition on the topics of nature and environment based in Innsbruck, Austria. The festival is part of the Green Film Network, an international association of environmental film festivals with the common goal to raise the awareness of environmental topics. The festival was founded in 2013 by festival director Johannes Kostenzer.

Awarded films 

 2013: Schnee by August Pflugfelder
 2014: Virunga by Orlando von Einsiedel
 2015: Yellowstone by  &  and Banking Nature by Sandrine Feydel & Denis Delestrac

References 

Film festivals in Austria
Festivals in Innsbruck